= Garakji =

Garakji (Korean: 가락지; Hanja: 指環) were thick pairs of rings, typically made of silver, jade or gold, worn by married women in the Joseon Dynasty to signify marriage. Unpaired Garakji, as worn by unmarried women, were called Banji (Korean: 반지; Hanja: 斑指), which is the word used in modern Korea when referring to rings in general.
